The Council of Ministers of the Kingdom ( or Rijksministerraad) is the executive council of the Kingdom of the Netherlands, which is a state consisting of four constituent countries: Aruba, Curaçao, the Netherlands, and Sint Maarten. The Council of Ministers of the Kingdom consists of the Council of Ministers of the Netherlands complemented by one Minister Plenipotentiary of Aruba, one Minister Plenipotentiary of Curaçao, and one Minister Plenipotentiary of Sint Maarten. The Prime Minister of the Netherlands chairs the Council of Ministers of the Kingdom. Together with the King, the Council of Ministers of the Kingdom forms the Government of the Kingdom, also known as the Crown.

A significant difference between the Netherlands Ministers and the Ministers Plenipotentiary is that the former Ministers are accountable for their politics and policies to the Dutch parliament. The Ministers Plenipotentiary, however, are accountable to their national governments. Therefore, the Ministers Plenipotentiary usually do not resign in the event of a Dutch cabinet crisis.

Though the Kingdom of the Netherlands is statutorily distinguished from its constituent country of the Netherlands, the Council of Ministers, while mentioned in the Statute is, according to Article 5 of the Statute regulated by the Constitution. With adaptions regulated by the Statute for circumstances the Statute provides for certain situations, being affairs of the Kingdom that directly affect Curaçao, Aruba or Sint Maarten.

Laws applicable to the whole Kingdom are known as Kingdom Acts. An example of such a law is the "Kingdom Act regarding Dutch citizenship".

References 

Articles needing additional references from August 2018
All articles needing additional references